Right Hand Man may refer to:

Right Hand Man (album), an album by Eddy Raven
"Right Hand Man" (Eddy Raven song), this album's title track
"Right Hand Man" (Hamilton song), a song from the musical Hamilton
Right Hand Man, a character from the video game series Henry Stickmin